Severin, Séverin or Severinus is a masculine given name. It is derived from Latin severus "severe, serious, strict". It may refer to:

People
Pope Severinus (died 640)
Severin of Cologne (died 403)
Severinus of Noricum (c. 410-482), the "Apostle to Noricum", Roman Catholic saint
Saint Severinus of Septempeda (died 550), Roman Catholic bishop and hermit
Séverin of Paris, a hermit who lived on the site of the current Saint-Séverin, Paris church
 George Chapman (murderer), born Severin Klosowski, British serial poisoner and suspect in the Jack the Ripper murders
 Severin von Eckardstein (born 1978), German pianist
 Severin Roesen (c. 1815–72), a painter known for his still lifes of flowers and fruit
 Severyn Nalyvaiko, leader of the Ukrainian Cossacks, a hero of Ukrainian folklore
 Severin Freund (born 1988), a German ski jumper
 Steven Severin, stage name of co-founder of British post-punk band Siouxsie and the Banshees
 Adrian Severin (born 28 March 1954) Romanian politician and former Member of the European Parliament.

Fictional characters
 Severin von Kusiemski, a character in the novel Venus in Furs by Leopold von Sacher-Masoch
 Severin Winter, a wrestling prodigy in The 158-Pound Marriage, a novel by John Irving
 Severinus of Sankt Wendel, in the novel The Name of the Rose by Umberto Eco
 Severin, in the novel Severin's Journey into the Dark by Paul Leppin
 Severin, in the movie Shortbus
 Severin von Phoenix, in the Japanese manga and anime Princess Resurrection by Yasunori Mitsunaga
Dr. Severin, in the original Star Trek episode "The Way To Eden"
Severin, The Horned Boy in the Holly Black novel "The Darkest Part of the Forest"
Severin Unck, a character in the novel "Radiance" by Catherynne M. Valente
Séverin Montagnet-Alarie, a character in the novel "The Gilded Wolves" by Roshani Chokshi

See also
St. Severin (disambiguation)
Severino (Italian, Spanish, and Portuguese version of the name)
Søren (given name) (Danish version of the name)
Seweryn (Polish version of the name)
Severyn (Ukrainian version of the name)

German masculine given names
French masculine given names